Hatun Urqu (Quechua hatun big, urqu, mountain, "big mountain", Hispanicized spelling Jatun Orjo) is a mountain in the Cusco Region in Peru, about  high. It is situated in the Acomayo Province, on the border of the districts Acomayo, Acos and Rondocan. Hatun Urqu lies south-west of the mountain Pisqu Urqu.

There is an intermittent stream south of Hatun Urqu named Saramayu (Quechua for "maize river", Saramayo). It flows to the north-west as a right affluent of the Apurímac River.

References 

Mountains of Peru
Mountains of Cusco Region